Denby is a village in the English county of Derbyshire that is notable as the birthplace of John Flamsteed, England's first Astronomer Royal, and the location of the Denby Pottery Company. The population at the 2001 Census was 1,827, increasing to 2,190 at the 2011 Census.

History
The settlement was listed in the Domesday Book of 1086 as Denebi. By 1334, it was a market town and held an annual fair in September. For over two centuries, ironstone and clay were being mined; coal mining started in the 1200s. Royal astronomer  John Flamsteed (1646–1719) was born in Denby.

In 1806, William Bourne leased the clay bed that had been discovered while a road was being built. Three years later, the family began manufacturing salt-glazed pottery under the Bourne name, with son Joseph running the operation. By the Second World War Denby had switched to producing tableware as well as industrial parts. Brown was the primary colour but the company shifted toward more attractive colours after the war. Ownership of the company remained with the family until 1942; after several owners, Denby was acquired by a consortium that was funded by Valco Capital Partners. The enterprise continues today as the Denby Pottery Company.

Description
Denby is home to a secondary school which is named after John Flamsteed. The village was once served by Denby railway station on the Midland Railway Ripley Branch.

There is a memorial garden for John Flamsteed, opposite St Mary the Virgin's Church, which features the stellarsphere which shows the position of the stars and planets overhead at the current time.

The village is commemorated in the hymn tune Denby, composed in 1904 by Charles J. Dale.

Other settlements in Denby parish 

Denby Common is a hamlet 1 mile to the north east of Denby village, on the outskirts of Loscoe.
Codnor Breach, another hamlet, merges into Denby Common.
Denby Bottles is half a mile to the west of Denby Village.
Smithy Houses lies north west of Denby Village, along the B6179 road.

All four of these, along with a small southern area of Marehay in Ripley, and a small portion of Openwoodgate near Belper, lie within Denby parish.

Notable people
In addition to John Flamsteed:
 Henry Draycott (ca.1510 – 1572), a highly successful judge in Ireland.
 Harry Wingfield (1910–2002), an illustrator
 Paul Copley (born 1944), an actor and voiceover artist.
 Daniel Kitson (born 1977), comedian and writer.

Sport 
 Joseph Cresswell (1865–1932), a cricketer who played 15 first-class cricket games for Warwickshire from 1895 to 1899.
 William Wilmot (1869—1957), a cricketer who played 10 first class games and for Derbyshire between 1897 and 1901.
 Tommy Allott (1908-1975), a motorcycle speedway rider

See also 
List of places in Derbyshire
Listed buildings in Denby

References

External links 

GENUKI page

Villages in Derbyshire
Civil parishes in Derbyshire
Geography of Amber Valley